Fernando Valerio Gil (1806 – 2 November 1863) was an agriculturalist and soldier from the Dominican Republic. He is considered a hero of the battles of Santiago —together with José María Imbert—, and Sabana Larga —together with Juan Luis Franco Bidó—. He was commander in chief of the northern border.

General Fernando Valerio Gil was born in 1806 in Sabana Iglesia, in the parish of Santiago. Described as white and blue-eyed, Valerio was born in a family of Spanish ancestry. His parents were Narciso Valerio and Elena Gil Tineo. Valerio married his first cousin once removed Petronila Suriel Fernández (c. 1801–1908) in 1827, with whom he begot 7 children. He also had offspring with other two women, with María Ignacia Gómez had two children and with Eduviges Peña had four children.

During the Haitian regime that ruled Santo Domingo, Valerio belonged to the civic infantry in which he reached the rank of captain. After the Dominican Independence was declared in February 1844, the Haitian president Charles Hérard advanced with his troops to reconquer the rebel territory, but Valerio, at the head of a contingent, confronted him. This event, that was known as the "Charge of the Andulleros", was decisive for the Dominican victory at the Battle of Santiago (March 1844). When the Dominican War of Independence ended in 1856, Valerio was promoted to the rank of Divisional General.

He died on 2 November 1863.

Ancestry

References 

Dominican Republic people of Spanish descent
1863 deaths
1806 births
People from Santiago Province (Dominican Republic)
Dominican Republic independence activists
Dominican Republic revolutionaries 
People of the Dominican War of Independence
Dominican Republic military personnel
White Dominicans